Alia Janine Dailey-Willis, known professionally as Alia Janine, is an American comedian and former pornographic film actress.

Early life
Janine was born in Milwaukee, Wisconsin, and raised in the city's East Side until second grade when her family moved to Port Washington, Wisconsin. The family moved frequently, back to  Milwaukee, then to West Bend, Wisconsin, again back to Milwaukee, then to Texas, then back to Milwaukee, and finally West Bend, where she attended high school. At 18 she returned to Milwaukee.

Adult career
Janine started in the adult entertainment industry as an exotic dancer when she was 20 years old. After a year-and-a-half, she took a hiatus from performing and attended Milwaukee Area Technical College, where she earned a degree in police science and briefly worked as a security guard. She began her career performing in pornographic films at age 30, co-starring in a Score Magazine video titled Mamazon. She retired from the adult entertainment industry after four years to go back to school and to focus on her writing, standup comedy, and acting. Besides adult films, she has also been featured in music videos, TV talk shows, news shows, and radio shows, as well as cable and feature films.

Mainstream films and TV
Janine was an extra in the Spike Jonze film Her (2013). She also appeared on Playboy TV's original series Foursome as herself on Season 4, Episode 5.

As a porn performer, Janine spoke widely about the adult industry's Measure B and testing protocols. She has appeared on Russia TV, as well as multiple blogs, radio shows, podcasts, and video interviews to voice her opinion on Measure B and the testing procedures.

Comedy career
Janine began her comedy career in 2010 when she appeared on Sam Tripoli's The Naughty Show and in skits at the Hollywood Improv. Upon retiring from pornographic films in 2013, she moved to New York City to pursue comedy full-time. She has trained at the Comedy Cellar in New York City, and at Gotham Comedy Club through the Manhattan Comedy School. She has studied improvisational comedy and sketch writing at Upright Citizens Brigade in New York City.

Janine performs at New York City comedy clubs including The Creek & The Cave, New York Comedy Club, Upright Citizens Brigade, Gotham Comedy Club, and others. She produces and hosts touring comedy shows with her company, Hardcore Comedy Entertainment. These include the Whormones Comedy Show based on her The Whormones Podcast; the Hardcore Comedy Show; and Cutthroat Comedy Hour.

In November 2014, Janine announced the launch of a podcast network, The Misfits Podcast Network, hosting a wide variety of podcast shows.
The Milwaukee Record listed Janine as one of 11 notable comedians with Wisconsin roots, and she received a 2015 AVN Award nomination for Mainstream Star of the Year.

References

External links 
 
 
 

1970s births
American pornographic film actresses
Living people
Actresses from Milwaukee
American stand-up comedians
American women comedians
Pornographic film actors from Wisconsin
Comedians from Wisconsin
People from West Bend, Wisconsin
21st-century American comedians
21st-century American women